The 1973–74 Winnipeg Jets season was their second season in the World Hockey Association (WHA).

Regular season

Season standings

Playoffs

Houston Aeros 4, Winnipeg Jets 0

Player statistics

Forwards
Note: GP= Games played; G= Goals; A= Assists; PTS = Points; PIM = Points

Defencemen
Note: GP= Games played; G= Goals; A= Assists; PTS = Points; PIM = Points

Goaltending
Note: GP= Games played; MIN= Minutes; W= Wins; L= Losses; T = Ties; SO = Shutouts; GAA = Goals against

Draft picks
Winnipeg's draft picks at the 1973 WHA Amateur Draft.

References
Jets on Hockey Database

Winnipeg Jets (1972–1996) seasons
Winn
Winn